Sin Cargo is a 1926 American silent thriller film directed by Louis J. Gasnier and starring Shirley Mason, Robert Frazer and Earl Metcalfe. The film's sets were designed by the art director Edwin B. Willis.

Plot
The film is about a man in financial ruin who becomes involved in pearl smuggling, but conceals the fact from his sister.

Cast
 Shirley Mason as Eve Gibson
 Robert Frazer as Captain Matt Russell
 Earl Metcalfe as Harry Gibson
 Lawford Davidson as Jim Darrell
 Gertrude Astor as Mary Wickham
 Pat Harmon as Captain Barry
 Will Walling as Customs Official 
 Billy Cinders as Cooper
 James T. Mack as Butler

References

Bibliography
 Goble, Alan. The Complete Index to Literary Sources in Film. Walter de Gruyter, 1999.

External links
 

1926 films
1920s thriller films
1920s English-language films
American silent feature films
American thriller films
American black-and-white films
Films directed by Louis J. Gasnier
Tiffany Pictures films
Seafaring films
Silent thriller films
1920s American films
Silent adventure films